Oreochloa is a genus of European plants in the grass family.

 Species
 Oreochloa blanka Deyl - Pyrenees of Spain + France + Andorra
 Oreochloa confusa (Coincy) Rouy  - Spain
 Oreochloa disticha (Wulfen) Link - France, Switzerland, Germany, Austria, Poland, Czech Republic, Romania, Slovenia, Slovakia, Serbia, Croatia, Ukraine, Moldova
 Oreochloa elegans Sennen - Pyrenees of Spain + France + Andorra
 Oreochloa seslerioides (All.) K.Richt. - French Pyrenees + French Alps

References

External links
 Všechna práva vyhrazena, Oreochloa disticha (Wulfen) Link – holnice dvouřadá / hôľnička dvojradová in Czech with photos
 Flora Catalana, Oreochloa disticha (Wulfen) Link subsp. blanka (Deyl) Küpfer in Catalan with photos
 Горянка дворядна Oreochloa disticha (Wulfen) Link (Poa disticha Wulfen, Sesleria disticha (Wulfen) Pers.) in Ukrainian with photos
 Oreochloa disticha - Boimka dwurzędowa in Polish with photos
 Archiv/Gasteinertal: Poaceae, Graminaceae - Oreochloa in German with photos

Pooideae
Poaceae genera
Flora of Europe